Rothmund–Thomson syndrome (RTS) is a rare autosomal recessive skin condition.

There have been several reported cases associated with osteosarcoma. A hereditary basis, mutations in the DNA helicase RECQL4 gene, causing problems during initiation of DNA replication has been implicated in the syndrome.

Signs and symptoms
 Sun-sensitive rash with prominent poikiloderma and telangiectasias
 Juvenile cataracts
 Saddle nose
 Congenital bone defects, including short stature and radial ray anomalies such as absent thumbs
 Hair growth problems (absent eyelashes, eyebrows and/or hair)
 Hypogonadism has not been well documented
 Hypodontia
 Calcium problems (not documented in journals)
 Ear problems (not documented in journals but identified by patients in support groups)
 Produces osteosarcoma

The skin is normal at birth. Between 3 and 6 months of age, the affected carrier develops poikiloderma on the cheeks. This characteristic "rash" that all RTS carriers have can develop on the arms, legs and buttocks. "Poikiloderma consists of areas of increased and decreased pigmentation, prominent blood vessels, and thinning of the skin."

Accelerated aging

In humans, individuals with RTS, and carrying the RECQL4 germline mutation, can have several clinical features of accelerated aging.  These features include atrophic skin and pigment changes, alopecia, osteopenia, cataracts and an increased incidence of cancer.  Also in mice, RECQL4 mutants show features of accelerated aging.

Causes 

RTS is caused by a mutation of the RECQL4 gene, located at chromosome 8q24.3. The disorder is inherited in an autosomal recessive manner. This means the defective gene responsible for the disorder is located on an autosome (chromosome 8 is an autosome), and two copies of the defective gene (one inherited from each parent) are required in order to be born with the disorder. The parents of an individual with an autosomal recessive disorder both carry one copy of the defective gene, but usually do not experience any signs or symptoms of the disorder.

DNA repair

RECQL4 has a crucial role in DNA end resection that is the initial step required for homologous recombination (HR)-dependent double-strand break repair.  When RECQL4 is depleted, HR-mediated repair and 5’ end resection are severely reduced in vivo.  RECQL4 also appears to be necessary for other forms of DNA repair including non-homologous end joining, nucleotide excision repair and base excision repair.  The association of deficient RECQL4-mediated DNA repair with accelerated aging is consistent with the DNA damage theory of aging.

Diagnosis

Management

History 
The condition was originally described by August von Rothmund (1830–1906) in 1868. Matthew Sydney Thomson (1894–1969) published further descriptions in 1936.

See also 
 Poikiloderma vasculare atrophicans
 List of cutaneous conditions
 List of radiographic findings associated with cutaneous conditions

References

External links 
 GeneReviews/NCBI/NIH/UW entry on Rothmund-Thomson Syndrome
 

Autosomal recessive disorders
DNA replication and repair-deficiency disorders
Genodermatoses
Rare diseases
Syndromes affecting the skin
Progeroid syndromes
Syndromes affecting stature
Syndromes affecting the eye